The 2015–16 AWIHL season is the ninth season of the Australian Women's Ice Hockey League. It will run from 24 October 2015 until 24 January 2016.

League business
On Monday, 13 July 2015 it was announced that this season will see changes to the import rules, which were as follows:

1. Anyone that doesn't have Permanent Residency is an import, including New Zealanders.
2. Only 4 imports per roster, and only 2 can play per game.
3. No import goalies.

Regular season
The regular season begins on 24 October 2015 and will run through to 24 January 2016

October

November

December

January

Standings
Note: GP = Games played; W = Wins; SW = Shootout Wins; SL = Shootout losses; L = Losses; GF = Goals for; GA = Goals against; GDF = Goal differential; PTS = Points

The regular season league standings are as follows:

Source

Scoring leaders
Note: GP = Games played; G = Goals; A = Assists; Pts = Points; PIM = Penalty minutes

Leading goaltenders
Note: GP = Games played; Mins = Minutes played; W = Wins; L = Losses: OTL = Overtime losses; SL = Shootout losses; GA = Goals Allowed; SO = Shutouts; GAA = Goals against average

Playoffs

Bronze Medal Game

Gold Medal Game

See also

Ice Hockey Australia
Joan McKowen Memorial Trophy

References

External links 
Australian Women's Hockey League official site
Adelaide Adrenaline official site
Brisbane Goannas official site
Melbourne Ice official Site
Sydney Sirens

Australian Women's Ice Hockey League seasons
Aust
ice hockey
ice hockey